This is a list of trips made by UN Secretary-General António Guterres. The list includes all travels outside of the Headquarters of the United Nations in New York City, United States. Guterres assumed office on January 1, 2017. He visited 84 countries.

2017

2018

2019

2020

2021

2022

2023

References

External links
 Official Travels of the Secretary-General

Guterres, António
Secretaries-General of the United Nations